Sinartoria is a small genus of east Asian wolf spiders. It was first described by L. Y. Wang, V. W. Framenau and Z. S. Zhang in 2021, and it has only been found in China.  it contains only two species: S. damingshanensis and S. zhuangia.

See also
 List of Lycosidae species

References

Lycosidae genera
Spiders of China